Labinje is a village northeast of Cerkno in the traditional Littoral region of Slovenia.

The local church is dedicated to the Holy Spirit and belongs to the Parish of Cerkno. It was built in 1723 by the builder Matija Maček (c. 1657–1737) from the Poljane Valley.

References

External links

Labinje on Geopedia

Populated places in the Municipality of Cerkno